General elections were held in Romania in December 1933, the third in three years. The Chamber of Deputies was elected on 20 December, whilst the Senate was elected in three stages on 22, 28 and 29 December.

The result was a victory for the governing National Liberal Party (PNL), which won 300 of the 387 seats in the Chamber of Deputies and 105 of the 108 seats in the Senate elected through universal male suffrage.

Results

Chamber of Deputies

Senate

References

Parliamentary elections in Romania
Romania
1933 in Romania
Romania
Election and referendum articles with incomplete results
1933 elections in Romania